Kiru is a Local Government Area in Kano State, Nigeria. It's headquarters are in the town of Kiru.

It has an area of 927 km and a population of 264,781 based on the census conducted in 2006.

The postal code of the area is 711.

References

Local Government Areas in Kano State